David Van Hoyweghen (born 20 March 1976 in Hamme) is a Belgian former professional footballer who last played for HSV Hoek.

As a young player Van Hoyweghen began playing for K.F.C. V.W. Hamme before joining K.S.K. Beveren in 1988. In 1995 Van Hoyweghen made his debut for the first team. In 1998 Van Hoyweghen joined Eendracht Aalst, another club from the Jupiler League. After the relegation of Eendracht Aalst the defender was taken in by K.A.A. Gent. There he played 3 years before joining Sint-Truiden V.V. In the 2006–2007 season David rejoined his former club K.S.K. Beveren but the future did not look very good for the club after their relegation at the end of the season. Therefore, Van Hoyweghen stepped over to Roeselare.

References

External links

1976 births
Living people
Belgian footballers
K.A.A. Gent players
K.S.K. Beveren players
K.S.V. Roeselare players
S.C. Eendracht Aalst players
People from Hamme
Association football defenders
Sint-Truidense V.V. players
Sportkring Sint-Niklaas players
HSV Hoek players
Belgian Pro League players
Belgian expatriate footballers
Belgian expatriate sportspeople in the Netherlands
Expatriate footballers in the Netherlands
Footballers from East Flanders